Achacollo (possibly from Aymara Jach'a Qullu, jach'a big, great, qullu mountain, "big mountain") is a mountain in the Barroso mountain range in the Andes of Peru, about  high. It is situated in the Tacna Region, Tacna Province, Palca District, and in the Tarata Province, Estique District, northwest of the Chupiquiña volcano and Huancune.

References 

Mountains of Peru
Mountains of Tacna Region